Francesc Viñas i Dordal (27 March 1863 – 14 July 1933) was a Spanish operatic tenor. He is also known by the Spanish version of his name, Francisco Viñas and the Italian version, Francesco Vignas. He was particularly known for his performances in the operas of Richard Wagner and sang in the first production of Parsifal outside Bayreuth.

Life and career
Viñas was born in Moià, a small town near Barcelona. At the age of 23, he enrolled in singing lessons at the Barcelona Conservatory where he studied under . After hearing him in some of the conservatory's concerts, Juan Goula, a principal conductor at the Gran Teatre del Liceu, urged him to study the title role of Lohengrin. Viñas went on to make his operatic debut at the Liceu on 9 February 1888 in Lohengrin. It was to become one of his signature roles.

Julián Gayarre, another Spanish tenor noted for his Wagnerian roles, was in the audience at the Liceu for Viñas's debut and was reportedly so impressed with the performance that he gave Viñas his own Lohengrin costume. Viñas soon received invitations to sing at other Spanish opera houses and in Italy. In the space of three years he sang Lohengrin 120 times. He debuted at Turin's Teatro Regio in 1890 and at Milan's La Scala in 1891, both times as Lohengrin.

Viñas was married to the Italian operatic mezzo-soprano Giulia Novelli (1859–1932).

Legacy
In 1963 the Francisco Viñas Singing Contest was founded in his honor.

References

External links

Opera singers from Catalonia
People from Moianès
1863 births
1933 deaths
Conservatori Superior de Música del Liceu alumni
Spanish operatic tenors
19th-century Spanish male opera singers
20th-century Spanish male opera singers